The 1999 Australian Open women's doubles was the women's doubles event of the eighty-seventh edition of the Australian Open, the first Grand Slam of the year and the most prestigious tournament in the Asia-Pacific and the Southern Hemisphere. Martina Hingis and Mirjana Lučić were the defending champions, but Hingis competed with Russian Anna Kournikova, and Lučić competed with Frenchwoman Mary Pierce. Lučić and Pierce were defeated in the first round by Christina Singer and Helena Vildová.
Hingis and Kournikova, however, ended up winning the title, defeating first seeds Lindsay Davenport and Natasha Zvereva, 7–5, 6–3. With this win, Hingis won her fifth consecutive Grand Slam title in doubles, and became the only woman to have won three consecutive Australian Open titles in singles and doubles simultaneously. Hingis and her partners defeated Davenport/Zvereva for all five consecutive women's doubles titles starting with the 1998 Australian and ending with the 1999 Australian Open.

Seeds

Draw

Finals

Top half

Section 1

Section 2

Bottom half

Section 3

Section 4

External links
 1999 Australian Open – Women's draws and results at the International Tennis Federation

Women's Doubles
Australian Open - Women's Doubles
Australian Open (tennis) by year – Women's doubles
1999 in Australian women's sport